Bqaa Safrine     is a Lebanese Sunni Muslim village, located in the Miniyeh-Danniyeh District. It had 2,750 eligible voters in the 2009 elections.

History
In 1838, Eli Smith noted  the village as Buka'a Sufrin  located in the Ed-Dunniyeh area, whose inhabitants were Sunni Muslim.

References

Bibliography

External links
Bqaa Safrine, Localiban

Populated places in Miniyeh-Danniyeh District
Populated places in Lebanon
Sunni Muslim communities in Lebanon